The 2005-2006 season in Danish 2nd Division was divided in two groups. The two winners, Næstved BK and Aarhus Fremad, promoted to the 2006–07 Danish 1st Division, together with the winner of a promotion game, Thisted FC, between the two runners-up.

Second squad teams can not promote, or play promotion game.

East group

Top goalscorers

West group

Top goalscorers

Promotion game
The two runners-up will play promotion game on home and away basis.

First leg

Second leg

2006
3
Danish